The Wazir tribe is one of the three major clans of the Khogyani tribe of Karlani Pashtun.  The Wazir are primarily found in the southern and central regions of Nangarhar Province, Afghanistan, particularly Khogyani District and Pachir Aw Agam District. 

Ethnic groups in Nangarhar Province
Karlani Pashtun tribes